The fourteenth series of the British medical drama television series Casualty commenced airing in the United Kingdom on BBC One on 18 September 1999 and finished on 25 March 2000. It saw another increase, this time to 30 episodes.

Cast

Overview
The fourteenth series of Casualty features a cast of characters working in the emergency department of Holby City Hospital. The series begins with 13 roles receiving star billing, which is an increase from the previous series. Robert Gwilym stars as emergency medicine consultant and clinical director Max Gallagher and Gerald Kyd appears as senior house officer Sean Maddox. Derek Thompson continues his role as charge nurse Charlie Fairhead while Barbara Marten portrays sister Eve Montgomery. Cathy Shipton features as Lisa "Duffy" Duffin, a senior staff nurse who is promoted to sister. Jan Anderson, Claire Goose and Jonathan Kerrigan star as staff nurses Chloe Hill, Tina Seabrook and Sam Colloby. Pal Aron appears as bed manager Adam Osman, who is later hired as a staff nurse. Ian Bleasdale and Donna Alexander portray paramedics Josh Griffiths and Penny Hutchens. Rebecca Wheatley stars her role as Amy Howard and Vincenzo Pellegrino features as Derek "Sunny" Sunderland. Susan Cookson also continues her semi-regular role as nurse Julie Day.

Sandra Huggett joins the cast in episode 1 as Holly Miles, a senior house officer. Kerrigan departs in episode 5, Pellegrino makes his final appearance in episode 7 and Marten exits in episode 8. Michelle Butterly and Kwame Kwei-Armah debut in episode 9 as paramedics Mel Dyson and Fin Newton respectively. Ronnie McCann made his first appearance as staff nurse Barney Woolfe in episode 12, while Ian Kelsey joins the cast in episode 15 as Patrick Spiller, a specialist registrar in emergency medicine. Ben Keaton guest appeared in episodes 16 and 18 as Spencer, a role he would reprise in the following series. Holby City character Julie Fitzjohn, portrayed by Nicola Stephenson, guest starred in episode 17. In December 1999, Goose announced her plans to leave the series. Kyd also chose to leave after becoming disheartened with his character. Goose and Kyd's characters depart in episode 30 in scenes filmed in Australia.

Main characters 

Donna Alexander as Penny Hutchens
Jan Anderson as Chloe Hill
Pal Aron as Adam Osman
Ian Bleasdale as Josh Griffiths
Michelle Butterly as Mel Dyson (from episode 9)
Claire Goose as Tina Seabrook (until episode 30)
Robert Gwilym as Max Gallagher
Sandra Huggett as Holly Miles (from episode 1)
Ian Kelsey as Patrick Spiller (from episode 15)
Jonathan Kerrigan as Sam Colloby (until episode 5)
Kwame Kwei-Armah as Fin Newton (from episode 9)
Gerald Kyd as Sean Maddox (until episode 30)
Barbara Marten as Eve Montgomery (until episode 8)
Ronnie McCann as Barney Woolfe (from episode 12)
Vincenzo Pellegrino as Derek "Sunny" Sunderland (until episode 7)
Cathy Shipton as Lisa "Duffy" Duffin
Derek Thompson as Charlie Fairhead
Rebecca Wheatley as Amy Howard

Recurring and guest characters 

Sam Barriscale as Reuben Hurst (episode 18)
Sharon Bower as Joan Gallagher (episodes 23 and 24)
Susan Cookson as Julie Day (until episode 30)
Ian Fitzgibbon as Jon Crowe (episodes 19−23)
Grahame Fox as Jonathan Lewis (episodes 14 and 24)
Michael J. Jackson as Mike Branscombe (episodes 6 and 7)
Ben Keaton as Spencer (episodes 16 and 18)
Ian Keith as Gary Milton (episode 4)
Tobias Menzies as Frank Gallagher (episodes 18−23)
Tanya Myers as Joanne Foster (episodes 27−30)
Greg Prentice as Jake Foster (episodes 27−30)
Doraly Rosen as Angie Lynch (episodes 19−24)
Morag Siller as Leona (from episode 23)
Nicola Stephenson as Julie Fitzjohn (episode 17)
Darren Tighe as Matt Tyler (episodes 19−23)
Jade Williams as Gemma Foster (episodes 27−30)

Episodes

References

External links
 Casualty series 14 at the Internet Movie Database

14
1999 British television seasons
2000 British television seasons